Kamal Vora (born 19 May 1950) is a Gujarati language poet and editor from Mumbai, India. He is an editor of Etad, a quarterly Gujarati literary magazine.

Biography
Kamal Vora was born on 19 May 1950 at Rajkot, Gujarat, India. He worked as an electrical engineer for seven years in a factory in Kalyan where his father used to work. Later he entered pharmaceutical industry with his brother.

Since 2010, he co-edits, with Naushil Mehta, a Gujarati quarterly journal Etad, founded by Suresh Joshi. He was a member of the Gujarati advisory board of Sahitya Akademi.

He lives in Ghatkopar, Mumbai.

Works
Vora started writing poetry at the age of 18. His poems started appearing in magazines from 1971. His first anthology of poems Arav was published in 1991, followed by AnekEk (2012) and Vruddhashatak (2015). His poems have been translated in Hindi, Marathi, Bengali, Kannada and English and appeared in Indian Literature, Chicago Review, Anthology of Asian Poets, Muse India etc. He co-edited with Pravin Pandya Aadhunik Bharatiya Kavita (Selection of Gujarati poetry from 1950 to 2010), published in 2017.

Awards
He received the Sahitya Akademi Award (2016) for Gujarati for his book AnekEk (2012). His book Arav was awarded the Umashankar Joshi award. In 2022, he was awarded the 2020 Gangadhar National Award For Poetry.

See also
 List of Gujarati-language writers

References 

1950 births
Gujarati-language writers
Recipients of the Sahitya Akademi Award in Gujarati
Living people
Writers from Mumbai
Poets from Maharashtra
Indian male poets
20th-century Indian poets
Indian magazine editors
20th-century Indian male writers
Recipients of the Gangadhar National Award